The Fall is a 1999 thriller film written by Mike Walker and directed by Andrew Piddington.

Cast

External links

1999 films
1999 thriller films
British thriller films
Canadian thriller films
1990s English-language films
English-language Canadian films
English-language Hungarian films
1990s Hungarian-language films
Films scored by Fred Mollin
Films shot in Budapest
Films shot in Hungary
Hungarian thriller films
1999 multilingual films
British multilingual films
Canadian multilingual films
Hungarian multilingual films
1990s Canadian films
1990s British films